Öztürk Serengil (2 May 1933 – 11 January 1999) was a Turkish actor and comedian. He is mostly known as one of the famous comedians in Turkish films.

Biography
He was born in Artvin, Turkey on 2 May 1933 as the son of a teacher. He started his acting career with a play Oğlum Edvard (My Son Edward). In 1958, he worked with Oda Theatre and since 1959, with Istanbul City Theatre. His first cinema film was Üçüncü Kat Cinayeti'. In his early films, he played the role of the villain. He took up comedy which quickly became very popular among the filmgoing public. He appeared in a total of more than 400 films and theatre plays.

Öztürk Serengil died of brain cancer on 11 January 1999 at the age of 68. He married four times. TV presenter Seren Serengil is his daughter.

References

External links

1933 births
People from Artvin
Turkish comedians
Turkish male film actors
Turkish male stage actors
1999 deaths
20th-century Turkish male actors
20th-century comedians